Giant Killers or Giant Killer may refer to:

Air traffic control
Giant Killer (call sign), used in the United States

Entertainment
Giantkiller, a comic book series
"Giant Killer" (story), a 1945 sci-fi short story by A. Bertram Chandler 
Giant Killers (video game), a 2001 football-management simulator video game
Giant Killers (band), a 1994 performer on Top of the Pops
 Giant Killers (EP), a 2017 release by Japanese idol group BiSH
The Giant Killer the UK title for the 2013 film Jack the Giant Killer, starring Ben Cross

Sports
Giant killers (sports), an underdog team or person that defeats an expected winner
1967 Oregon State Beavers football team, nicknamed "Giant Killers" for their performance

See also
Giant-killing (disambiguation)